Bridge of Clouds is a 2018 Burmese drama film directed by Aw Ra Tha starring Nay Toe, Khin Wint Wah, Htun Htun, and Vietnamese actress Nguyen Tran Huyen My. The film was produced by 7th Sense Film Production.

Plot
Pann is a doctor assigned to a government hospital in a small town of Shan State. During a stormy night, an unknown patient arrived to the hospital. The patient was seriously injured by hail and also suffered from malaria. After the incident, he didn't remember anything about himself. For the medical record, hospital staff then decided to give him the name That Tant, meaning Rainbow in Burmese. Since That Tant forgot where he came from, he decided to stay at the hospital and help patients and other people. Time has been passed and That Tant became attached to the town which is now his home. At a traditional festival, a tourist took a photo of That Tant dancing in the festival, and uploaded it to a social network. The photo was then found by May, a girlfriend of That Tant who is living in Australia. May decided to come to Myanmar and search That Tant.

Cast
 Nay Toe as That Tant. His real name is Daniel, May's boyfriend.
 Khin Wint Wah as Dr. Pann Hla Phyu
 Htun Htun as Sai Lone
 Nguyen Tran as May

References

External links

2018 films
2010s Burmese-language films
Burmese drama films
Films shot in Myanmar